Norway competed at the 1908 Summer Olympics in London, England. It was the second appearance of the European nation, after having made its Olympic debut in 1900.

Medalists

Results by event

Athletics

Norway's best athletics result was Arne Halse's silver medal in the javelin throw.

Fencing

Gymnastics

Rowing

Sailing

Shooting

Wrestling

Sources
 
 

Nations at the 1908 Summer Olympics
1908
Olympics